The  was an infantry division of the Imperial Japanese Army. It was formed 1 February 1945 in Wuhan as a type C(hei) security division, simultaneously with the 131st and 133rd divisions. The nucleus for the formation was the small parts of the 39th and 68th divisions.

Action
The 132nd division was permanently assigned to 6th area army. Upon formation, the 132nd division took the responsibility on the area previously guarded by the 39th division in Yichang. It stayed in the area of Yichang until surrender of Japan 15 August 1945.

See also
 List of Japanese Infantry Divisions

Notes and references
This article incorporates material from Japanese Wikipedia page 第132師団 (日本軍), accessed 7 July 2016
 Madej, W. Victor, Japanese Armed Forces Order of Battle, 1937–1945 [2 vols], Allentown, PA: 1981.

Japanese World War II divisions
Infantry divisions of Japan
Military units and formations established in 1945
Military units and formations disestablished in 1945
1945 establishments in Japan
1945 disestablishments in Japan